Brecksville–Broadview Heights High School is a comprehensive public high school located in Broadview Heights, Ohio, United States. The school has approximately 1,350 students in grades 9–12. Students come from the communities of Brecksville, Broadview Heights, and a very small segment of North Royalton. The school year consists of two 90-day semesters with four nine-week grading periods. Athletic teams are known as the Bees and the school colors are crimson and gold.

Student achievement

Academic rankings
The Brecksville–Broadview Heights High School has received various awards for excellence in education. In 2008, the U.S. Department of Education recognized Brecksville–Broadview Heights High School as an NCLB Blue Ribbon School. Brecksville–Broadview Heights High School was also a past nominee, by the Ohio Department of Education, for the prestigious Blue Ribbon School Award.

In 2015, The Washington Post published the list of America's most challenging high schools. The analysis covered approximately 22,000 U.S. public high schools. The rankings were determined by taking the total number of Advanced Placement, International Baccalaureate and Advanced International Certificate of Education tests given at a school each year and dividing by the number of seniors that graduated. Brecksville–Broadview Heights High School ranked in the top 4 percent of all high schools in this assessment.

Brecksville–Broadview Heights High School has consistently been ranked by U.S. News & World Report magazine as being in the top 5 percent of all high schools in the United States. Additionally, Brecksville–Broadview Heights High School was recognized in Newsweek magazine's 2013 list of the top 2000 public high schools in the United States.

Sport championships
BBHHS athletic teams are known as the Bees and are members of the Suburban League. The girls' gymnastics team has won 22 state championships including a run of 19 consecutive titles through 2022. The boys' wrestling team won the 2015 state championship. The basketball, football, soccer, cross-country, and swimming/diving programs vie for regional and state titles as well, including:
 Girls' gymnastics – 1994, 2000, 2001, 2004, 2005, 2006, 2007, 2008, 2009, 2010, 2011,2012, 2013, 2014, 2015, 2016, 2017, 2018, 2019, 2020, 2021, 2022 
 Football – 1983 
 Boys' soccer – 1975, 1981, 1992, 1993 
 Girls' cross country – 2007
 Girls' volleyball – 2016
 Boys' team wrestling – 2015

Art and writing awards
In 2015, 27 Brecksville-Broadview Heights middle and high school art students received a total of 36 regional awards through the 35th Annual Scholastic Art & Writing Awards competition. Five students who were awarded Gold Keys had their artwork judged on the national level in New York.

Music
Brecksville–Broadview Heights High School offers multiple music classes such as the band, choir, orchestra, and AP Music Theory programs.
• The band program is made up of the 300 member Marching Bees, four concert bands (Wind Ensemble, Concert Winds, Symphonic Gold Band, and Symphonic Crimson Band), Jazz Ensemble, Percussion Ensemble, Pep Band, and Flagline.
• The orchestra provides chamber orchestra, concert orchestra, and symphonic orchestra music performances throughout the year.
• The choir provides Symphonic Choir, Mens’ Choir, Treble Choir, Chamber Choir, and Music in Motion that perform throughout the year.

Notable on-campus event 
 In September 2004, President George W. Bush, running for re-election, made a Saturday morning "town hall-style visit" at the school. A crowd of about 4,000 filled the gymnasium to see Bush speak and answer audience questions. An additional 500 people  watched on a large screen from a secondary gymnasium.

Notable alumni 

 Steve Gillespie - professional soccer player in the Professional Arena Soccer League
 Michael T. Good - NASA astronaut
 Ann Liguori - sports radio and television broadcaster
 Joshua McAdams - Olympic steeplechase runner
 Eric Musselman - head coach in college basketball and the National Basketball Association (NBA) 
 Mike Rose - professional football player in the National Football League (NFL)
 Scott Roth - professional basketball player in the NBA and head coach in the National Basketball League (NBL)
 Tom Tupa - professional football player in the NFL

References

External links
 School website

High schools in Cuyahoga County, Ohio
Public high schools in Ohio
1882 establishments in Ohio
Educational institutions established in 1882